Breeda Moynihan-Cronin (born 31 March 1953) is a former Irish Labour Party politician who served as a Teachta Dála (TD) for the Kerry South constituency from 1992 to 2007.

She was born in Cork in 1953, but is a native of Killarney, County Kerry. She was educated at St. Brigid's Secondary School, Killarney; Dominican College Sion Hill, Dublin; and Skerry's College, Cork. Her father, Michael Moynihan, was a TD for Kerry South from 1981 to 1987 and from 1989 to 1992. She worked as a bank official before becoming involved in politics in 1991 when she was elected to Kerry County Council. She was first elected to Dáil Éireann at the 1992 general election as a Labour Party TD for Kerry South, succeeding her father. She was re-elected at every election until 2007.

She held a number of Front Bench positions in the Labour Party, including, Spokesperson on Justice, Equality and Law Reform (1997–1998), Social, Community and Family Affairs (1998–1999), Tourism and Recreation (1999–2002), Social, Community and Family Affairs (2002–2003), and Equality and Law Reform (2003–2007). Moynihan–Cronin is a former Chairperson of the Labour Party.

On 11 October 2005, she announced that she would not stand for re-election at the forthcoming general election due to ill-health. Her decision to retire presented considerable difficulties for the Labour Party to retain her seat, as the party performed poorly at the local elections in 2004, failing to elect any councillors within the constituency. However, on 28 October 2006, she announced that she would stand in the forthcoming general election, having overcome her health difficulties. However, she failed to retain her seat.

In June 2011, she returned to politics when she was co-opted onto Kerry County Council to represent the Killarney area, filling the seat left vacant when Marie Moloney was elected to Seanad Éireann. In 2013, she stood down from the council and was replaced by Sean Counihan who subsequently lost the seat in the 2014 local elections.

References

 

1953 births
Living people
Labour Party (Ireland) TDs
Members of the 27th Dáil
Members of the 28th Dáil
Members of the 29th Dáil
20th-century women Teachtaí Dála
21st-century women Teachtaí Dála
Local councillors in County Kerry
People educated at Skerry's College
People educated at Dominican College Sion Hill